Attila Fekete (born 24 January 1974) is a Romanian-born Hungarian fencer. He competed in the individual and team épée events at the 2000 Summer Olympics.

References

External links
 

1974 births
Living people
Sportspeople from Satu Mare
Hungarian male foil fencers
Olympic fencers of Hungary
Fencers at the 2000 Summer Olympics
Naturalized citizens of Hungary 
Romanian people of Hungarian descent